The Flower Sermon is a story of the origin of Zen Buddhism in which Gautama Buddha transmits direct prajñā (wisdom) to the disciple Mahākāśyapa. In the original Chinese, the story is Niān huā wēi xiào (拈花微笑, literally "Pick up flower, subtle smile").

Content
In the story, the Buddha gives a wordless sermon to his disciples (sangha) by holding up a white flower. No one in the audience understands the Flower Sermon except Mahākāśyapa, who smiles. Within Zen, the Flower Sermon communicates the ineffable nature of tathātā (suchness) and Mahākāśyapa's smile signifies the direct transmission of wisdom without words. The Buddha affirmed this by saying:

Jung and Kerényi demonstrate a possible commonality in intent between the Flower Sermon and the Eleusinian Mysteries:
One day the Buddha silently held up a flower before the assembled throng of his disciples. This was the famous "Flower Sermon."  Formally speaking, much the same thing happened in Eleusis when a mown ear of grain was silently shown.  Even if our interpretation of this symbol is erroneous, the fact remains that a mown ear was shown in the course of the mysteries and that this kind of "wordless sermon" was the sole form of instruction in Eleusis which we may assume with certainty.

History
The story of the Flower Sermon appears to have been recorded by Chinese Chán Buddhists. The earliest known version of the tale appeared in 1036.

See also
Mahayana sutras
Platform Sutra
Southern School

Notes

References
 Welter, Albert. 2000. Mahākāśyapa’s Smile: Silent Transmission and the Kung-an (Kōan) Tradition. In The Kōan: Texts and Contexts in Zen Buddhism, edited by Steven Heine & Dale S. Wright. Oxford and New York: Oxford University Press, pp. 75–109.

Buddhist sermons
Chan Buddhism
Flowers in religion
Gautama Buddha